Simiskina philura is a butterfly in the family Lycaenidae first described by Hamilton Herbert Druce in 1895. It is found on Peninsular Malaysia and Borneo.

Subspecies
Simiskina philura philura (Borneo)
Simiskina philura elioti Corbet, 1940 (western Malaysia)

References

Butterflies described in 1895
Simiskina
Butterflies of Borneo
Taxa named by Hamilton Herbert Druce